The discography of Gram Rabbit, an American indie rock band from Joshua Tree, California consists of five studio albums, and three extended plays. The band was formed in 2003 by singer/keyboardist/guitarist Jesika von Rabbit, guitarist/singer Todd Rutherford and bassist/sampler Travis Cline. Although on hiatus, its current line-up is Jesika von Rabbit, Todd Rutherford, Jason Gilbert, Ethan Allen. Jesika von Rabbit has released one studio album.

Albums

Studio albums

Music to Start a Cult To

Cultivation

RadioAngel & the RobotBeat

Miracles & Metaphors

Welcome to the Country

Demo albums

Extended Play

Rare Bits

The Desert Sound E.P.

Braised & Confused

Singles

Solo albums by Jesika von Rabbit

Studio albums

Journey Mitchell

Solo albums by Todd Rutherford

Studio albums

References

Rock music group discographies
Discographies of American artists